Timothy Edward Walsh (born December 16, 1954) is an American football coach, who is currently the head coach at Santa Margarita Catholic High School. He served as the head football coach at Sonoma State University from 1989 to 1992, Portland State University from 1993 to 2006, and California Polytechnic State University from 2012 to 2019, compiling a career college football coaching record of 176–148.

Early life and education
Walsh graduated from Junípero Serra High School in San Mateo, California in 1973 and the University of California, Riverside in 1977. At UC Riverside, Walsh was a backup quarterback with the Highlanders and majored in history.

Coaching career
From 1977 to 1980, Walsh was an assistant coach at his alma mater Serra High School. He then was head coach at Moreau Catholic High School in Hayward, California from 1981 to 1985. In 1986, Walsh moved up to the college level as defensive coordinator and linebackers coach at Santa Clara. After two seasons as offensive coordinator, Walsh became head football coach at Sonoma State University in 1989.

Walsh was the head coach at Portland State from 1993 through 2006, succeeding Pokey Allen, who left for Boise State (after defeating the Broncos soundly in Boise in 1992). In his 14 years at Portland State, Walsh compiled a 90–68 record and guided the Vikings from a Division II program to a Division I-AA contender. Walsh's tenure at Portland State was the longest of any previous Portland State football head coach. The Vikings made the Division II playoffs in 1993, 1994, and 1995, and the I-AA playoffs in 2000.

On February 16, 2007, Walsh left Portland State to become offensive coordinator and quarterbacks coach at Army under Stan Brock. Army went 3–9 in Walsh's two seasons, 2007 and 2008.

Walsh became a head coach again on January 9, 2009, when Cal Poly hired him.

Head coaching record

College

References

1954 births
Living people
American football quarterbacks
Army Black Knights football coaches
Cal Poly Mustangs football coaches
Portland State Vikings football coaches
Santa Clara Broncos football coaches
Sonoma State Cossacks football coaches
UC Riverside Highlanders football players
High school football coaches in California
Coaches of American football from California
Players of American football from San Francisco
Junípero Serra High School (San Mateo, California) alumni